Jake Hirst (born 5 May 1996) is an English professional footballer who plays for FSV Frankfurt, as a striker.

Early and personal life
Hirst was born in Bad Nauheim, Germany, to English parents from Yorkshire. His parents were tennis coaches, and as a youth Hirst worked as a coach at their tennis academy. Hirst did not know any German until beginning kindergarten. He is fluent in English and German, speaking both with a Yorkshire accent. He considers himself English.

Career
Hirst began his career with Eintracht Frankfurt, but was released by the club at the age of 15 due to problems with his knees. He then played for TSG Wieseck, TSG Ober-Wöllstadt (twice), FSV Frankfurt, TSV Bad Nauheim and Kickers Offenbach.

In August 2019 he signed for FC Gießen. In July 2020 he returned to FSV Frankfurt. During his time at Frankfurt he lived in Bad Nauheim and commuted to Frankfurt.

References

1996 births
Living people
German people of English descent
English footballers
German footballers
Eintracht Frankfurt players
FSV Frankfurt players
Kickers Offenbach players
FC Gießen players
Association football forwards
English expatriate footballers
English expatriates in Germany
Expatriate footballers in Germany
Regionalliga players
People from Bad Nauheim
Sportspeople from Darmstadt (region)
Footballers from Hesse